In mathematics, in the field of category theory, a discrete category is a category whose only morphisms are the identity morphisms:
homC(X, X) = {idX} for all objects X
homC(X, Y) = ∅ for all objects X ≠ Y

Since by axioms, there is always the identity morphism between the same object, we can express the above as condition on the cardinality of the hom-set

| homC(X, Y) | is 1 when X = Y and 0 when X is not equal to Y.

Some authors prefer a weaker notion, where a discrete category merely needs to be equivalent to such a category.

Simple facts 
Any class of objects defines a discrete category when augmented with identity maps.

Any subcategory of a discrete category is discrete. Also, a category is discrete if and only if all of its subcategories are full.

The limit of any functor from a discrete category into another category is called a product, while the colimit is called a coproduct.  Thus, for example, the discrete category with just two objects can be used as a diagram or diagonal functor to define a product or coproduct of two objects. Alternately, for a general category C and the discrete category 2, one can consider the functor category C2. The diagrams of 2 in this category are pairs of objects, and the limit of the diagram is the product. 

The functor from Set to Cat that sends a set to the corresponding discrete category is left adjoint to the functor sending a small category to its set of objects. (For the right adjoint, see indiscrete category.)

References 
 Robert Goldblatt (1984). Topoi, the Categorial Analysis of Logic (Studies in logic and the foundations of mathematics, 98). North-Holland. Reprinted 2006 by Dover Publications, and available online at Robert Goldblatt's homepage.

Categories in category theory